Cedric Wilson (born 6 June 1948) is a Northern Irish Unionist politician who served as a Member of the Northern Ireland Assembly (MLA) for  Strangford from 1998 to 2003.

Elected as a UK Unionist Party (UKUP) candidate to the Assembly, Wilson left the party the following year, forming his own party, the Northern Ireland Unionist Party (NIUP).

Career
Born in Belfast, Wilson became the director of a private nursing home. In 1981, he was elected to Castlereagh Borough Council for the Democratic Unionist Party, a post he held until 1989. During this time, he became known for his role in campaigning against the Anglo-Irish Agreement.

At the 1982 Northern Ireland Assembly election, Wilson stood unsuccessfully in Belfast South.

In 1996, he joined the UK Unionist Party (UKUP), and was elected to the Northern Ireland Forum under the top-up system in 1996. When the Forum was replaced by the Northern Ireland Assembly, Wilson won a seat in Strangford outright, initially placing third out of twenty-two candidates.

In 1999, Wilson and three of the four other UKUP Assembly members left the party to form the Northern Ireland Unionist Party (NIUP). They argued that they should not quit their Assembly seats should Sinn Féin take up its seats in the without prior Provisional Irish Republican Army decommissioning of weapons. Wilson became the party leader, and in the 2001 UK general election, he contested the Strangford parliamentary seat, but came bottom of the poll, with only 1.9% of the vote.

This poor showing was reflected in the 2003 Assembly election, when Wilson initially placed only tenth out of thirteen candidates, and all the NIUP members lost their seats.

Wilson remained leader of the NIUP, but the party is currently inactive. Wilson stood as an independent candidate in the Strangford constituency at the 2007 Assembly election where he polled 305 votes (0.8%), thus finishing last out of the fifteen candidates.

References
The Northern Ireland Assembly: Mr Cedric Wilson
Northern Ireland Elections: Strangford
CAIN: Biographies of Prominent People - 'W'

1948 births
Living people
Members of Castlereagh Borough Council
Leaders of political parties in Northern Ireland
Members of the Northern Ireland Forum
Northern Ireland MLAs 1998–2003
Democratic Unionist Party politicians
UK Unionist Party MLAs
Northern Ireland Unionist Party MLAs